The  is a limited express train service in Japan operated by JR Kyushu which runs between Kagoshima-Chūō and Miyazaki.

Rolling stock
 485 series (20 April 1995 - 12 March 2011)
 783 series
 787 series

External links

Named passenger trains of Japan
Railway services introduced in 1995